Eidsivating was the name of one of the original Norwegian popular assemblies or Things.  Historically, it was the site of court and assembly for the eastern parts of Norway.

Summary
Traditionally, Eidsivating was the court for the population around Lake Mjøsa. Eidsivating was originally situated at Åker gård, the seat of Vang in Hedmark county, Norway. When Norway was united as a kingdom, the first lagtings were constituted as superior regional assemblies, Eidsivating being one of them. These were representative assemblies at which delegates from the various districts in each region met to award legal judgments and pass laws (Eidsivatingloven). Later, during the time of St. Olav, the court was moved to Eidsvold. The jurisdiction of the court was then extended to include Romerike and Hadeland as well as Hedmark. Later Østerdalen and Gudbrandsdalen were also included.

The ancient regional assemblies – Frostating, Gulating, Eidsivating and Borgarting – were eventually joined into a single jurisdiction. King Magnus Lagabøte had the existing body of law put into writing (1263–1280). In 1274, Magnus promulgated the new national law (Magnus Lagabøtes landslov), a unified code of laws to apply for the Kingdom of Norway, including the Faroe islands and Shetland. This compilation of the codified Gulating laws (Gulatingsloven) applied throughout the realm was exceptional for its time. This code remained in force until Frederik III, king of the Dano-Norwegian personal union, promulgated absolute monarchy in 1660. Peder Schumacher Griffenfeld prepared a document which would form the King's Law (Kongeloven) dated 14 November 1665. This was codified in the King Act of 1665 which functioned as the constitution of the Union of Denmark-Norway until 1814.

See also

 Medieval Scandinavian law

References

Other sources
Andersen, Per Sveaas (1977) Samlingen av Norge og kristningen av landet : 800–1130 (Oslo: Universitetsforlaget) 
Larson, Laurence Marcellus (2011) The Earliest Norwegian Laws (The Lawbook Exchange, Ltd)

Further reading
Munch P.A. (1846) Norges gamle Love indtil 1387 (Christiania: Chr. Gröndahl)

External links
Åker gård i Hamar

Legal history of Norway
Thing (assembly)
Eidsvoll